Sergeant Preston of the Yukon is a half-hour long American action adventure northwestern television series, broadcast in color on CBS Thursday evenings at 7:30 to 8:00 p.m. from September 29, 1955, to September 25, 1958. It was based on the radio drama Challenge of the Yukon.

Synopsis

Richard Simmons starred as Sergeant Preston, who patrolled the Yukon Territory in search of renegades and outlaws, during the time of the Klondike Gold Rush of the 1890s. In every episode Preston was assisted by his Alaskan Malamute Yukon King, who had been raised by a female wolf. In episodes taking place during the summer he rode his horse Rex.
  
The show’s theme music was the overture to Emil von Reznicek's opera Donna Diana. As the theme played the announcer stated: "Sergeant Preston of the North-West Mounted Police, with Yukon King, swiftest and strongest lead dog, breaking the trail in the relentless pursuit of lawbreakers in the wild days of the Yukon."

At the end of each episode Preston would turn to his dog and say "Well, King, this case is closed."

Production
The series was filmed in mountainous sections of California and Colorado.  Trendle-Campbell-Meurer produced the first two seasons, and in its last season the Jack Wrather Corporation purchased the rights and produced Sergeant Preston of the Yukon.

Cast

Recurring roles
Richard Simmons as Sergeant William Preston 
Yukon King (dog)
Rex (horse)

Guest stars
The guest stars on Sergeant Preston included: 
Francis De Sales appeared in five episodes, concluding as Cy Bartok in "The Diamond Collar".
Kelo Henderson, played Pete Hollis in the 1958 episode "Escape to the North".
Ed Hinton appeared twice in 1956 as Barry Jeffers in "Remember the Maine" and as Lefty "Red" Burke in "The Rookie".
I. Stanford Jolley was Sam Haley in "The Fancy Dan" (1956) and Frisco in "Gold Rush Patrol" (1958).
Tyler MacDuff played Bill Corey in "Lost River Roundup" in 1957.
John M. Pickard appeared four times in 1956–1957 in different roles, including the role of Red Brody in "Old Ben's Gold".
Robert Shayne, was in the 1957 episode, "The Mark of Crime."
William Boyett appeared as Constable Malloy in "Gold Fever" from 1956, and appeared as Cary Braddock in "Ten Little Indians" from 1957.
Dan Blocker played 'Mule' Conklin in "Underground Ambush" from 1957.

Release

Syndication 
Because the series was filmed in color it remained popular long after its original prime-time broadcast. Starting in the early 1960s it was shown on Saturday mornings. The popular show aired internationally for decades.

During the 2010s, the series was shown on GRIT classic TV/movie network, and on FETV (Family Entertainment TV).

DVD

Timeless Media Group released a two-disc best-of set featuring ten episodes from the series in Region 1 on November 21, 2006.

Infinity Entertainment]has released all three seasons of the series on DVD in Region 1.

Comic books

Dell Comics had produced Sergeant Preston comics based on the radio version, and then from 1956 to 1959 they brought out 29 issues based on the television series.

In the 1980s Don Sherwood adapted the series into comic books, with scripts by Stan Stunell.

Sponsorship
In 1955, the Quaker Oats company gave away land in the Klondike as part of the Klondike Big Inch Land Promotion which was tied in with the television show. Genuine deeds each to one square inch of a lot in Yukon Territory, issued by Klondike Big Inch Land Co. Inc., were inserted into Quaker's Puffed Wheat and Puffed Rice cereal boxes.

References

External links

1955 American television series debuts
1958 American television series endings
American Broadcasting Company original programming
English-language television shows
Television series based on radio series
Television shows adapted into comics
Royal Canadian Mounted Police in fiction
Klondike Gold Rush in fiction
CBS network films
Television series by Universal Television
1950s Western (genre) television series
Canadian Western (genre) television series